Richard Bond (1798–1861) was an early American architect who practiced primarily in Boston, Massachusetts.

Life and career
Richard Bond, son of a farmer, was born March 5, 1798, in Conway, Massachusetts. He was drawn to the study of architecture by the construction of the First Parish Church in nearby Northampton, which was completed in 1812 and designed by Asher Benjamin. As a young adult, Bond moved to Boston and established himself as a carpenter.

Bond is known to have been working as an architect-builder beginning in the mid-1820s, later crossing over into pure architecture. In 1833 he became the partner of Isaiah Rogers and formed Rogers & Bond. The firm lasted only until the following year, when Rogers left Boston to reestablish his office in New York City.  Bond worked alone until 1850, when he made architect Charles Edward Parker a partner.  Bond & Parker lasted until 1853, when both resumed his independent practice.  Bond continued his practice alone until his death.

Bond was one of the architects who met in 1836 in New York's Astor House (designed by Rogers) to form the American Institute of Architects.

Bond died at his home in Roxbury on August 6, 1861. He was survived by his wife, and he left his architectural library to the library of Amherst College.

Noted architect Alexander Rice Esty worked for Bond during the 1840s.

Work

Richard Bond, before 1833

Rogers & Bond, 1833-1834

Richard Bond, 1834-1850

Bond & Parker, 1850-1853

Richard Bond, from 1853

Gallery

References

19th-century American architects
Architects from Massachusetts
Architects from Boston
1861 deaths
1798 births
People from Conway, Massachusetts